Rabbi Yeshayahu Hadari
(1933 – April 25, 2018) was an Israeli religious scholar and the first rosh yeshiva of Yeshivat HaKotel, a position he held for over thirty years.

Biography
Yeshayahu Hadari was born in Tel Aviv in 1933. In his youth, he studied at the Bilu School and at Yeshivat HaYishuv HaChadash in the city. Later on, he studied 
at the Chevron Yeshiva in Jerusalem.  He was close to Rabbi Zvi Yehuda Kook and Rabbi David Cohen, the "Rav HaNazir".

In 1955, he was critically wounded by a grenade blast. After waking from an extended coma, the name Chaim (meaning "life") was added to his name to signify his survival of a near-death experience.

In March 1957, he married Naomi Rakover, the daughter of Chaim Rakover and the granddaughter of Simcha Mandelbaum.

In 1962, Hadari was appointed Mashgiach ruchani at Yeshivat Kerem B'Yavneh, where he worked for three years. During the 60's and 70's, Hadari gave talks on the daily Bible chapter on the radio.

In 1967, Hadari was appointed to head the prestigious Yeshivat HaKotel in the Jewish Quarter of the Old City of Jerusalem. Over the decades, he taught thousands of students. He was the author of several books, including commentaries on the works of Rabbi Abraham Isaac Kook.

He died in Jerusalem on April 25, 2018 at the age of 84.

References

Sources
Yeshayahu Hadari Sichot - Yeshivat Hakotel
Yeshayahu Hadari Wikipedia page - Hebrew

1933 births
2018 deaths
Israeli Rosh yeshivas
People from Tel Aviv